This is a list of crossings of the Anacostia River and its two branches, the Northeast Branch Anacostia River and Northwest Branch Anacostia River.  With the exception of the downstreammost crossings in Washington, D.C., all locations are in Maryland.

Main stem

Northeast Branch

Northwest Branch

References 

Anacostia River
Anacostia